Brisaspor is a Turkish professional road bicycle racing team based in Kocaeli, and sponsored by the local Brisa Bridgestone Sabancı Lastik company of Turkish Sabancı Group, which produces and distributes Bridgestone tires from Japan. The cycling team is part of the Brisaspor Club.

Preparations to form a cycling team goes back to 1978, when a summer camp was opened to build infrastructure. The team was officially established in 1982 with the twelve sportspeople from the summer camp as Lassaspor, which was sponsored by the Turkish Lassa company that is the main facility for the production of both tire brands.

Already in 1983, the team became Turkish champion. In 1999, Brisaspor began to participate at competitions of international level. It is the first champion of the Presidential Cycling Tour of Turkey. Between 2001 and 2007, Brisa became seven consecutive times champion of the Tour of Turkey. In 2001, women cycling team was formed. From 2005 on, the club took part in mountain biking (MTB) competitions.

Team member Bilal Akgül became the first ever Turkish Olympian cyclist participating at the mountain biking event of 2008 Summer Olympics. Kemal Küçükbay took part at the men's road race event of 2012 Summer Olympics. Team member Onur Balkan qualified for participation in the road race event at the 2016 Summer Olympics.

Brisaspor consists of 28 sportspeople, five technical staff, twelve senior men, seven junior men and four women.

Team roster 

As of July 2016.

 G.Manager: Nadir Yavuz
 Coach: Mert Mutlu

Senior men's

MTB men's

Women's

Major wins 

1999
Overall Tour of Mevlana, Mert Mutlu

2000
Overall Tour of Mevlana, Mert Mutlu

2001
Overall Presidential Cycling Tour of Turkey, Mert Mutlu

2003
Overall Presidential Cycling Tour of Turkey, Mert Mutlu
Stage 5, Mert Mutlu

2005
Overall Presidential Cycling Tour of Turkey
Stage 3, Mert Mutlu

2009
OverallTour du Maroc, Alexandr Dymovskikh
Stage 3, Alexandr Dymovskikh

2010
Overall Tour of Marmara, Kemal Küçükbay
Stage 1 Tour of Marmara, Mert Mutlu

2011
Overall Tour of Trakya, Kemal Küçükbay
Stage 3, Kemal Küçükbay
Overall Cappadocia, Mert Mutlu
Stage 1, Mert Mutlu
Overall Tour of Victory, Nazim Bakırcı
Stage 3, Nazim Bakırcı

2012
Overall Grand Prix Dobrich II, Stefan Hristov

2013
Tour of Bulgaria
Stage 2, Stefan Hristov
Overall Tour of Szeklerland, Georgi Petrov Georgiev
Stages 2, Georgi Petrov Georgiev

2014
Overall Tour of Szeklerland, Stefan Hristov
Stages 2 & 3a (ITT), Stefan Hristov

2015
Tour of Ankara
Points classification, Onur Balkan
Stages 2 & 3, Onur Balkan
Stage 2 Tour of Aegean, Onur Balkan
Black Sea Cycling Tour
Points classification, Onur Balkan
Stage 2, Onur Balkan
Tour of Çanakkale
Points classification, Onur Balkan
Stage 1, Onur Balkan
Stage 2 Tour of Mersin, Onur Balkan
Mountains classification International Tour of Torku Mevlana, Onur Balkan
Overall Tour of Bulgaria, Stefan Hristov
Stage 2, Stefan Hristov

2016
Stage 2 Tour du Maroc, Onur Balkan
Tour de Serbie
 Mountains classification, Stefan Hristov
Stage 2, Georgi Petrov Georgiev

National champions 

2005
 Road Race Championships, Kemal Küçükbay

2006
 Road Race Championships, Bilal Akgül
 U23 Road Race Championships, Recep Ünalan

2007
 Road Race Championships, Uğur Marmara
 U23 Road Race Championships, Recep Ünalan

2008
 Road Race Championships, Orhan Şahin
 Time Trial Championships, Kemal Küçükbay
 U23 Road Race Championships, Recep Ünalan

2009
 Time Trial Championships, Muhammet Eyüp Karagöbek

2010
 Road Race Championships, Behçet Usta
 Time Trial Championships, Kemal Küçükbay

2011
 Road Race Championships, Kemal Küçükbay
 Time Trial Championships, Mert Mutlu

2012
 Time Trial Championships, Muhammet Eyüp Karagöbek
 Women Road Race Championships, Semra Yetiş
 Women Time Trial Championships, Merve Tayfun Marmara
 U23 Road Race Championships, Lütfullah Tanrıverdi

2013
 U23 Road Race Championships, Onur Balkan
 U23 Time Trial Championships, Onur Balkan

2014
 National Time Trial Championships, Stefan Hristov
 Women Time Trial Championships, Cansu Celebi
 U23 Road Race Championships, Onur Balkan

2016
 Road Race Championships, Onur Balkan
 Road Race Championships, Georgi Georgiev

References

External links
 Official website

Cycling teams based in Turkey
Cycling teams established in 1982
1982 establishments in Turkey
Sport in İzmit